The University of America is a cross-border, transnational American university located in Willemstad, Curacao.

Founded as Salt Lake Baptist College in 1983, the institution  grew into an international Baptist interdisciplinary and technological distance-learning institution. The university emphasizes quality over size, concentrating on a core of academic disciplines with a strong reputation in Natural Medicine, Health Sciences, Law, Theology and Philosophy, Arts, engineering and applied sciences.

The university has 13 schools, containing 30 academic departments; particularly noted are its programs in Religion, Theology, Philosophy, Natural Medicine, Health Sciences, Mechanical Engineering, Petroleum Engineering, Economics and Business Administration.

The University of America is one of the universities of former Netherlands Antilles.

Academics

University of America is a highly selective institution with students from all over the globe.

Academic departments

 Division of Economics, and Finance
 Division of Engineering and Applied Science Chemical Engineering
 Industrial Engineering
 Mechanical Engineering
 Petroleum Engineering
 Division of Architecture
 Automotive Engineering
 Aerospace and Aviation Engineering
 Drone and EvTol Engineering
 School of Law , Diplomacy and International Relations.
School of Divinity ,
Department theology and Ministry
Department of Canon Law and Moral Ethics .
Department of Biblical Literature and Languages
Department of Catholic and Orthodox Studies.
Department Islamic and Arabic Studies.
Department of Comparative Philosophy Religion, Missiology and Intercultural Studies.
School of Education and Letters.
Department of Education and Letters.
Department of Education Administration.
Department of Computer Science
Department of Computer Software Engineering.
Department of Hardware Engineering.
Department of Nanoscience and Engineering.
And many others . for more detailed information see www.uoa.edu.cw , and www.ua-edu.us

Campuses

Main campus

"Willemstad", University of America's online main campus is in Willemstad, Curacao with administrative offices and study centers  in the United States and other countries

Recognition and Accreditation 
The University of America Curacao located in Willemstad, Curacao , is a Curacao transnational Anglo- American university licensed to operate by the government of Curacao. The institution has a royal charter granted to it by the Prime Minister and the minister of education, science, culture and sport of Curacao. The University of America Curacao, is institutionally and programmatically accredited by the Curacao government recognized accreditor - Curacao Transnational Accreditation Council (CTAC).B.V, a Curacao regional and transnational accreditation agency recognized by Curacao Ministry of Education, Science, culture and sport.

External links

References

Educational institutions established in 1983
Universities and colleges in Curaçao
1983 establishments in Curaçao